Alsinidendron viscosum, also called climbing alsinidendron,  is a species of flowering plant in the family Caryophyllaceae. It is endemic to lowland and montane moist forests in Hawaii. It is threatened by habitat loss.

References

Caryophyllaceae
Endemic flora of Hawaii
Critically endangered plants
Taxonomy articles created by Polbot